Shahdadpur Railway Station is located in Shahdadpur city, Sanghar district, Sindh, Pakistan.

See also
 List of railway stations in Pakistan
 Pakistan Railways

References

External links

Railway stations in Sanghar District
Railway stations on Karachi–Peshawar Line (ML 1)